Arizona's 23rd Legislative District is one of 30 in the state, situated in eastern Maricopa County. As of 2021, there are 57 precincts in the district, with a total registered voter population of 183,790. The district has an overall population of 236,716.

Political representation
The district is represented for the 2021–2022 Legislative Session in the State Senate by Michelle Ugenti-Rita (R, Scottsdale) and in the House of Representatives by Joseph Chaplik (R, Fountain Hills) and John Kavanagh (R, Fountain Hills).

References

Maricopa County, Arizona
Arizona legislative districts